Garnet Ostermeier, later surname: Fiordalisi, (born in May 1961) is a German former competitive figure skater who represented West Germany. She is the 1976 World Junior silver medalist, 1976 Nebelhorn Trophy champion, and a two-time German national medalist. She was coached by Evy Scotvold, Carlo Fassi, and Frank Carroll. She lived in Santa Ana, California before joining Fassi in Denver, Colorado.

Fiordalisi coaches figure skating in southern California.

Competitive highlights

References 

1961 births
German female single skaters
Living people